In the Chinese motorcycle industry VOLFONE (officially Luoyang Volfone Industrial and Trade Co., Ltd.) is a Chinese trading company and also producing motorcycles, quad bikes, generators, tricycles, 3 wheeled motorcycles, plug-in vehicles and engines, based in Yanshi, Luoyang City, Henan Province, China. It claims to have a yearly output of over 500,000 motorcycles.

VOLFONE is the original trading and manufacturer company in China.

History 
 1993 The company was established as the Yanshi Yongxin Motorcycles Parts Factory. 
 1997 corporate with Jiangsu Xiongfeng Motorcycles Co., Ltd. 
 2005 Volfone's annual sales volume exceeded 10,000 units for the first time. 
 2014 corporate with Luoyang Northern Dahe Motorcycle Co., Ltd. 
 2015 corporate with Luoyang Zongshen Piaggio Motorcycles Co., Ltd.

Model 
 Xiongfeng 110cc Motorcycle/Tricycle
 Xiongfeng 125cc Motorcycle/Tricycle
 Xiongfeng 150cc Motorcycle/Tricycle
 Xiongfeng 175cc Motorcycle/Tricycle
 Zongshen Piaggio 110cc Tricycle
 Zongshen Piaggio 125cc Tricycle
 Zongshen Piaggio 150cc Tricycle
 Zongshen Piaggio 175cc Tricycle
 Zongshen Piaggio 200cc Tricycle
 Electric Tricycle
 Plug-in Electric Vehicle

XF150-ZH 
Specification
 Engine type: four-stroke, one-cylinder, air-cooled
 Displacement: 125/175cc
 Fuel economy: 50 km/l

Companies based in Henan
Vehicle manufacturing companies established in 1993
Chinese brands
Motorcycle manufacturers of China
ATVs